Bola Vithal Shetty (Dr.) is an India born American scientist who developed Metolazone and was associated with the Food and Drug Administration agency.

References

Living people
People from Udupi
Year of birth missing (living people)
American people of Indian descent